Per Degaton is a supervillain appearing in American comic books published by DC Comics.

A young version of the character was portrayed by Cory Grüter-Andrew on the first season of Legends of Tomorrow, while an unknown actor portrayed his older self.

Publication history
Per Degaton made his first appearance in All Star Comics #35 (June/July 1947) and was created by John Broome and Irwin Hasen.

Per Degaton was one of the six original members of the Injustice Society, who began battling the Justice Society of America in All Star Comics #37 (October 1947).

Fictional character biography

Pre-Crisis
Per Degaton has been obsessed with time travel ever since he was an assistant to the Time Trust, a group of scientists developing a time ray to go to the future and acquire an effective bombing defense for use during World War II. In 1941, the Justice Society of America is sent 500 years into the future to retrieve a formula that produces a bomb-proof shield. In a fit of jealousy, Per Degaton sabotages the formula, causing it to fail its second test, and leaves the Time Trust soon after.

By 1947 Degaton is assisting Professor Malachi Zee, a former member of the Time Trust who is developing a time machine. Degaton plans to take the machine for himself and shoots Zee. Several times Degaton tries without success to alter the course of history for his own benefit, including thwarting the course of historical events like the Battle of Arbela between Greece and Persia in 331 B.C., thus halting technological development and allowing him and his henchmen to conquer an America of ancient technologies with modern weapons which he had left in specially-prepared caves, safe from the alterations to the time stream. The JSA stop various plans by Degaton and history reverts to normal, with everyone losing the memory of these events, due to time paradoxes inherent in Zee's time machine. The story closes with Professor Zee in his lab with Per Degaton, who seems to remember some foolishness about him dreaming that he ruled the world. The JSA is able to learn of their own success through Wonder Woman's magic sphere.

Degaton's memory returns and, after again killing Zee, he attempts to change the circumstances of the Japanese attack on Pearl Harbor. Degaton tries to stop the JSA with the help of villains he has pulled back in time: the Monster, King Bee, Professor Zodiak, Sky Pirate, Solomon Grundy and Wotan, who imprisons the JSA in a magical aura. However, the All-Star Squadron get involved, and stop his attack on San Francisco. When Degaton tries to destroy the island where the JSA are imprisoned, the Spectre is released, who frees the other members, after which Degaton returns the villains to their own time periods and returns himself to 1947, again losing his memory of the events. The heroes likewise lose the memory of Degaton's involvement.

Shortly thereafter, Degaton remembers all prior attempts through a dream that happens the night before Zee tests the time-machine. Again killing Zee, Degaton attempts to acquire weapons and technology from the future to conquer the world of the 1940s, but discovers he can travel between alternate Earths after accidentally traveling to Earth Prime and then to the Limbo between universes, where he gets the Crime Syndicate of America (formerly of Earth-Three), to steal nuclear missiles from Earth-Prime's Cuban Missile Crisis in 1962, which he brings to Earth-Two's 1942. They once again fight the JLA, the JSA, and the 1942 All-Star Squadron, but the combined forces of these heroes are enough to defeat Degaton. With his changes undone, he is again returned to 1947 with no memory of the events, while everyone else involved likewise lose their memories of events, and are returned to their proper times/worlds.

Once again, Degaton's memories eventually return and he attempts to kill Zee and steal the time machine. This time, however, Zee unexpectedly falls into the time machine, sending him 40 years into the future, where he will arrive on his 100th birthday. Degaton realizes that he simply must wait until the machine returns. Degaton begins a short career as an evil para-military commander and joins the Injustice Society of the World (ISW). Eventually, the ISW is defeated by the JSA and Degaton is sent to prison for 30 years.

After his release, Degaton roams the streets as a derelict until his old ally Brain Wave finds him homeless and in very poor health. Brain Wave decides to restore his vitality and create new bodies for himself and Degaton. Under cover of a series of natural disasters that he causes, Brain Wave uses a machine to sap the Justice Society's willpower and divert it to power Degaton's new body. After being defeated by the JSA, Degaton returns to prison (back in his original body), but is paroled ten years later due to advanced age, thanks to the intervention of Bruce Wayne.

Taking advantage of the revelation of "Batman's Diary", a document that supposedly convicted the Justice Society of treason, Degaton uses his remaining influence to attempt to indict the group in Congressional sub-committee. Degaton recognizes that this is likely his last chance to defeat his old enemies, since the return of Zee's time machine is close at hand. As the Congressional sub-committee becomes less and less convinced by evidence against the JSA, Degaton kidnaps Richard Grayson, Earth-2's Robin, and waits at the spot where the time machine should appear. It is revealed the diary was Batman's subliminal attempt to warn the Society about Degaton. The JSA, in pursuit of the captive Grayson, catch up to Degaton. The time machine re-appears and Zee staggers out, accusing Degaton of murder with his final breath. Surrounded by witnesses and facing prison for a 40-year-old murder charge at his advanced age, Degaton places the gun to his temple and fatally shoots himself.

Post-Crisis
Due to the events of the Crisis on Infinite Earths, Per Degaton, following his stint with the Time Trust, is employed at another secret scientific group, Project M. During this time he meets the time traveling robot Mekanique, who enlists his aid in her war against the All-Star Squadron. In exchange for his help, Mekanique promises to give him the secrets of time travel. They fail in their attack on the All-Stars, and Mekanique's body is destroyed, but Degaton salvages her head. He keeps her head by his side for the next five years, and they fall in love.

By 1947 Degaton is assisting Professor Malachi Zee who, with Degaton and Mekanique's help, finishes a time machine. Degaton plans to take the machine for himself and shoots Zee, who falls into the machine, sending him 40 years into the future. Mekanique suggests that the two of them simply wait four decades for the machine to reappear, but this idea drives Degaton into a lunatic rage. He buries Mekanique's head, and makes new plans for himself.

Frustrated for being unable to harm the JSA, Degaton uses his time-traveling abilities to "watch life hurting [his enemies]". Sequentially confronting the JSA members, he tells them that he saw them die, and reveals some hints on their final moments. Now equipped with a time disc, Degaton has the ability to live "between seconds", apparently ageless in an intangible state, which he can only be removed from with the concentrated tachyons found in the hourglass of Hourman.

He mounts a new attack on the JSA after Rick Tyler changes history to save his father from his death at the hands of Extant, the change of history creating a weakness in the timestream that Degaton can use to mount an attack. He makes arrangements to ensure that the JSA's temporary 1950s dissolution would become permanent before setting up an attack on the White House that would culminate in the Atom 'self-destructing', reasoning that the death of President Truman due to a costumed hero would disgrace all masked crime-fighters and leave them branded as traitors, thus erasing from history all subsequent superheroes. Degaton is eventually stopped by an alliance of the 1950s JSA and the early-2000s JSA. The timeline is restored so that his changes never occurred.  However, Degaton retreats into the time-stream with his memories intact rather than being forced back to 1947 with his memories wiped, renewing his commitment to watching his enemies' deaths across time.

Following his release from prison, Degaton reconstructs Mekanique, and the pair battle Infinity, Inc., at the site where Zee's time machine is to arrive. When it reappears, it contains not only the dying Zee but a 1947 version of Degaton himself. It is revealed that when Degaton lunged at the disappearing machine in 1947, the machine's energies created two Degatons, one who lives a normal life and one who is carried along with the time machine. The older Degaton disintegrates instantly due to the paradoxical existence of two Degatons at one moment. Mekanique kills the younger Degaton as well as herself, fearing this Degaton would end up betraying her once more.

Degaton returns briefly in Justice League of America and then in Booster Gold as part of a team with the Ultra-Humanite, Despero, Supernova, and Black Beetle, who have formed "The Time Stealers", a supervillain group that appears to be manipulating the timestream to their advantage. This version of Per Degaton, along with Ultra-Humanite and Despero, is from an earlier period in the timeline, pulled from their respective moments in time by Black Beetle and returned in the Time Masters: Vanishing Point limited series.

Later an older version of Degaton appears, calling himself Prime Degaton, who seems to have been present during the earlier plans of Per Degaton. He tells his younger self that by combining all of his infinite selves across the time lines, he will become omnipotent, but that will require his younger selves to cease to exist. When the Justice Society make Monument Point their new base, he appears with greater power over time and battles them, warning Jesse Quick about the villain D'arken, a fallen god.

In 2016, DC Comics implemented another relaunch of its books called "DC Rebirth", which restored its continuity to a form much as it was prior to "The New 52". Per Degaton appears as a member of the Cabal alongside Amazo, Doctor Psycho, Hugo Strange, Queen Bee, and Teel.

Per Degaton was seen as a member of the Injustice Society when Hawkman and Hawkgirl recount their time in the 1940s when the Justice Society fought the Injustice Society. Hawkman faced off against Per Degaton. After Brain Wave unleashes a powerful psychic attack that knocks everyone down, Per Degaton and Vandal Savage prepare to finish off Hawkman and Hawkgirl. Hawkman and Hawkgirl throw their maces enough for them to collide. This enables the Justice Society to turn the tables against the Injustice Society.

Powers and abilities
Per Degaton is skilled at armed combat and hand-to-hand combat. He is also a skilled tactician, possesses genius-level intellect, can become intangible, and is seemingly immortal.

Per Degaton possesses a limited "Time Vision", allowing him to know what will happen in the near future. He is out of phase with normal time, which renders him intangible. Hourman's tachyon-filled hourglass has been shown to blur his time vision and allow anyone possessing it to hit Degaton. He is also aware of changes to the timestream and has made mention of remembering events from before Crisis on Infinite Earths. However, it is unclear whether these are innate abilities Degaton acquired or if they are the result of his time disc.

Equipment
Per Degaton travels on a "time disc", a machine that allows him to travel through time as well as having fail-safes to return time to normal should his plans fail. He also uses small time discs which can speed up metabolism by variable amounts.

In other media

Animation
Per Degaton appears in the Batman: The Brave and the Bold episode "The Golden Age of Justice!", voiced by Clancy Brown. The Justice Society of America enlists Batman's help when Per Degaton is revived from suspended animation by his assistant Professor Zee. When he attacks the city, he uses the Spear of Destiny to age Batman, Doctor Mid-Nite, Flash, Hawkman, and Hourman to old age. He is defeated when the Spear backfires, turning him into an old man while Professor Zee is reduced to a baby. In "The Siege of Starro!", Per Degaton appears in a flashback attacking the White House with an army of robots until he is stopped by the Justice Society of America.

Arrowverse
Per Degaton is featured in Legends of Tomorrow with his younger self portrayed by Cory Grüter-Andrew and his older self portrayed by an uncredited actor. He is first mentioned in the first episode along with Julius Caesar and Adolf Hitler, and described by Rip Hunter as a "rank amateur" when compared to Vandal Savage. Degaton next appears as a young boy in his homeland of Kasnia in the episode "Progeny". In Hunter's timeline, he and his reign of the Kasnia Conglomerate will grow up to become instrumental to Savage's takeover of the world; he is groomed by Savage to become a dictator who is ultimately blamed for unleashing a virus called "Armageddon" designed to kill most of the world population, leaving it smaller and weakened enough for Savage to later conquer the planet (it was later revealed that Savage released the virus). Even one of Savage's children Cassandra believed Degaton to be a tyrant and Vandal having saved the world, when in actuality he is killed by Vandal. Rip's team considers killing Per while he is still just a boy and has yet to commit genocide but instead, they opt to simply abduct him and remove him from events to prevent Savage's rise to power. This does not alter the timeline, so Rip releases him after entreating Per to not let Savage turn him evil. The team's actions only accelerate events, leading to Degaton murdering his father in his sleep and his reign beginning at an earlier point. 
Per Degaton gets mentioned by Pat Dugan in the season 2 premiere episode of Stargirl as he was banished to an alternate reality by The Flash.

References

External links
 Per Degaton biography

DC Comics supervillains
DC Comics male supervillains
Earth-Two
Fictional characters with precognition
Fictional patricides
Golden Age supervillains
DC Comics Nazis
Comics about time travel
Comics characters introduced in 1947
Characters created by John Broome